General elections were held in Thailand on 6 January 2001 to elect the 500 seats of the House of Representatives. In accordance with the recently enacted 1997 constitution, the House of Representatives was composed of 400 members elected from single-member constituencies and 100 elected from national party lists on a proportional basis.

The Thai Rak Thai party co-founded and led by Thaksin Shinawatra won the largest number of votes and 248 of the 500 seats on a populist platform of economic growth and anti-corruption. Following the elections, it gained a parliamentary majority by merging with the New Aspiration Party, giving it 286 seats. A coalition government was formed with the Thai Nation Party. The Democrat Party, which had run on a platform supporting neoliberal, IMF-backed economic reforms, went into the opposition with the National Development Party.

Results

By constituency

Nationwide constituency

Single-member constituencies
Bangkok:  37 Seats

Siri Wangboonkerd (TRT)24,557
Krisada Sajjakul (TRT)25,089
Lalita Rirksamran (TRT)27,822
Kannikar Thammakesorn (TRT) 21,416
Prachuab Ungpakorn (TRT) 19,749
Mom Rajawongse Sukhumbhand Paribatra (Dem) 30,582
Charoen Kanthawaong (Dem) 26,978
Somkiat Chanthavanich (Dem) 21,450
Sitha Thivaree (TRT) 22,215
Issara Soonthornwat (Dem) 23,244
Piraphan Salirathawipak (Dem) 30,466
Chalermchai Jinawijarana (TRT) 34,857
Suppamas Isarapakdi (TRT) 23,577
Mom Rajawongse Damrongdis Disakul (TRT) 27,246
Ruaylarp Iamthong (TRT) 22,541
Anusorn Panthong (TRT) 33,780
Pramont Kunakasem (TRT) 24,512
Puwanida Khunpalin (TRT) 23,007
Pimol Srivikorn (TRT) 33,247
Re-election
Tawatchai Sajjakul (TRT) 32,518
Pattrasak Osathanukhroh (TRT) 29,760
Sansanee Narkpong (TRT) 28,453
Wattana Sengpairoh (TRT) 21,539
Mongkol Kimsoonchan (TRT) 39,656
Vicharn Minchainant (TRT) 43,274
Anek Hutangkabadi (TRT) 28,572
Pramote Sukhum (Dem) 21,944
Phimuk Simaroj (TRT) 29,100
Ong-art Klampaibul (Dem) 23,987
Pitipong Temcharoen (TRT) 30,927
Vilas Chanthapitak (Dem) 30,321
Suwat Muangsiri (TRT) 32,357
Suwat Wannasirikul (TRT) 34,615
Sakol Muangsiri (TRT) 40,000
Sutha Chanseang (TRT) 25,314
Sawaeng Rirkcharun (TRT) 35,654

North: 16 provinces, 76 seats

Chiang Mai (10 MPs)
Pakorn Buranapakorn (TRT) 33,605
Yaowapa Wongsawat (TRT) 45,981
Boonsong Teriyapirom (TRT) 29,542
Re-election
Pornchai Atthapiyangkul (TRT) 39,521
Noppakul Rathpathai (TRT) 49,728
Surapol Kiatchaiyakorn (TRT) 45,289
Panintra Pakkasem (TRT) 21,760
Yongyuth Suwaparp (Dem) 22,193
Santi Tansuhat (TRT) 29,981

Chiang Rai (8 MPs)
Samart Kaewmechai (TRT) 39,944
Sarit Ung-apinan (TRT) 51,621
Thavon Triratnarong. (TRT) 26,091
Visan Techateerawat (TRT) 32,393
Re-election
Yongyuth Tiyapairat (TRT) 30,927
Ittidej Kaewluang (TRT) 34,713
Buasorn Prachamon (TRT) 39,321

Kamphaeng Phet (5 MPs)
Preecha Musikul (Dem) 31,911
Kaneung Thaiprasit (TRT) 25,561
Weipoj Arpornrat (TRT) 26,662
Sanan Sabaimuang (TRT) 26,484
Thawil Rirkrai (TRT) 26,640

Lampang (5 MPs)
Piroj Lohsunthorn (TRT) 41,309
Chinda Wongsawat (TRT) 51,975
Re-election
Pinit Chanthasurin (TRT) 47,639
Re-election

Lamphun (3 MPs)
Apaporn Putthapuan (TRT) 32,402
Sa-nguan Pongmanee (TRT) 31,796
Songchai Wongsawat (Dem) 32,964

Mae Hong Son (2 MPs)
Panya Jinakham (Dem) 14,276
Somboon Praiwan (TRT) 16,397

Nakhon Sawan (7 MPs)
Pinyo Niroj (CTP) 32,012
Kasem Pan-udomlak (Dem) 34,184
Somkuan Oborm (CTP) 29,619
Sanchai Wongsunthorn (TRT) 31,117
Maytri Chartjindarat (TRT) 35,230
Banyin Tangpakorn (TRT) 24,252
Niroj Sunthornlekha (CTP) 22,073

Nan (3 MPs)
Khamron na Lamphun (Dem) 37,631
Cholanan Srikaew (TRT) 38,146
Wallop Supeeyasil (TRT) 22,647

Phayao (3 MPs)
Arunee Chamnanya (TRT) 26,924
Wisut Chainarun (TRT) 47,386
Kriangkrai Chaiyamonkol (TRT) 29,298

Phetchabun (7 MPs)
Re-election
Surasak Anakaphan (TRT) 33,023
Thaweesak Anakaphan (TRT) 26,706
Narongkorn Chawansantati (TRT) 21,428
Kitthikun Nakhabutr (TRT) 22,567
Kaew Buasuwan (NAP) 31,308
Paisal Chantarapakdee (TRT) 31,921

Phitsanulok Province (6 MPs)
Pitak Santiwongdecha (Dem) 25,975
Pisanu Polawei (TRT) 27,946
Mayura Manasikarn (TRT) 28,028
Suchon Champhunoj (TRT) 26,396
Nakorn Machim (Dem) 14,337
Veera Patamasiriwat (TRT) 29,397

Phrae (3 MPs)
Tosaporn Sereerak (TRT) 59,174
Siriwan Prassachaksatru (Dem) 50,010
Worawat Uea-apinyakul (TRT) 42,007

Phichit (4 MPs)
Pradit Pataraprasit (Dem) 40,846
Re-election
Siriwat Kachornprasart (Dem) 30,953
Adul Boonset (TRT) 47,134

Sukhothai (4 MPs)
Anongwan Thepsutin (TRT) 37,707
Re-election
Somchet Limpraphan (CPP) 31,468
Re-election

Tak (3 MPs)
Thanon Tantisunthorn (Dem) 37,640
Chaiwuth Bannawat (Dem) 37,936
Thanitphon Chaiyanant (Dem) 25,814

Uttaradit (3 MPs)
Kritsana Srihalak (TRT) 37,570
Re-election
Thanusak Lek-utai (TRT) 40,571

Central: 26 provinces, 95 seats

Ang Thong (2 MPs)
Viroj Pao-in (CTP) 31,065
Somsak Prisanananthakul (CTP) 43,765

Ayutthaya (5 MPs)
Kuakul Danchaivijit (TRT) 36,138
Pong Chiwanant (TRT) 39,476
Suvimol Phancharoenvorakul (TRT) 49,084
Withaya Buranasiri (TRT) 31,023
Boonphan Kaewattana (TRT) 25,703

Chachoengsao (4 MPs)
Anant Chaisaeng (TRT) 39,531
Itthi Sirilathayakorn (CPP) 34,879
Suchart Tancharoen (NAP) 24,324
Wuthipong Chaisaeng (TRT) 41,807

Chai Nat (2 MPs)
Anucha Nakasai (TRT) 36,533
Monthien Songpracha (CTP) 50,649

Chanthaburi (3 MPs)
Thawatchai Anampong (CPP) 37,731
Komkai Polabut (Dem) 41,258
Pongvej Vejjajiva.(TRT) 33,593

Chon Buri (7 MPs)
Sa-nga Thanasanguanwong (CTP) 36,823
Vidthaya Khunpluem (CTP) 31,866
Somchai Sahachairungrueng (CTP) 28,812
Surasit Nitiwutvoraluck (CTP) 29,906
Itthipol Khunpluem (CTP) 35,564
Charnsak Chavalitnititham (CTP) 25,607
Roj Wiphatpumiprathet (TRT) 23,042

Kanchanaburi (5 MPs)
Re-election
Santhad Jinapak (TRT) 35,824
Re-election
Re-election
Re-election

Lop Buri (5 MPs)
Natthapol Kiatvinaisakul (TRT) 31,521
Pongsak Vorapanya (TRT) 28,836
Kamol Chirapanwanich (CTP) 26,753
Amnuay Klangpa (TRT) 49,692
Niyom Vorapanya (TRT) 30,189

Nakhon Nayok (2 MPs)
Re-election
Re-election

Nakhon Pathom (5 MPs)
Prasan Boonmee (TRT) 29,254
Charnchai Pathummarak (TRT) 32,290
Pornsak Piemkla (TRT) 40,501
Chaiya Sasomsap (TRT) 30,276
Padermchai Sasomsap (TRT) 25,061

Nonthaburi (5 MPs)
Udomdej Ratanasathien (TRT) 29,221
Nithat Srinond (TRT) 28,650
Pimpa Chanprasong (TRT) 36,002
Apiwan Viriyachai (TRT) 43,656
Suchart Bandasak (TRT) 38,202

Pathum Thani (4 MPs)
Surapong Ungampornvilai (CPP) 36,404
Ekapote Panyaem (Dem) 45,919
Sumet Ritthakanee (TRT) 29,564
Likit Moodee (TRT) 33,546

Phetchaburi (3 MPs)
Alongkorn Polbutr (Dem) 52,006
Thani Yisarn (TRT) 47,595
Apichart Supapaeng (Dem) 39,951

Prachuab Khiri Khan (3 MPs)
Montri Pannoinon (Dem) 38,951
Chalermchai Sri-on (Dem) 38,790
Payao Pultharat (Dem) 39,907

Prachin Buri (3 MPs)
Sunthorn Vilawan (TRT) 37,313
Re-election
Woravut Pumakanchana (TRT) 37,959

Ratchaburi (5 MPs)
Re-election
Vivat Nitikanchana (TRT) 40,233
Prapaiphan Sengprasert (Dem) 38,600
Vijai Wattanaprasit (Dem) 32,024
Boonlue Prasertsopha (TRT) 37,296

Rayong (3 MPs)
Sathit Pitutaycha (Dem) 39,184
Sin Khumpha (TRT) 28,476
Piya Pitutaycha (CTP) 25,360

Sa Kaew (3 MPs)
Thanit Thienthong (TRT) 55,333
Trinut Thienthong (TRT) 58,953
Vitthaya Thienthong (TRT) 52,603

Samut Prakan (6 MPs)
Wallop Yangtrong (TRT) 27,859
Prasert Denapalai (TRT) 31,968
Pracha Prasobdee (TRT) 26,610
Chiraphan Limsakulsirirat (TRT) 26,453
Salinthip Chaisadom (TRT) 27,833
Re-election

Samut Songkhram (1 MP)
Rangsima Rodrasmee (Dem) 51,868

Samut Sakhon (3 MPs)
Anek Thapsuwan (Dem) 23,679
Sutham Rahong (Dem) 20,186
Udom Kraiwatnussorn (NAP) 27,594

Saraburi (4 MPs)
Ngern Boonsupa (TRT) 23,964
Yongyos Adireksarn (TRT) 21,995
Somchai Sunthornwat (TRT) 39,067
Veerapol Adireksarn (TRT) 41,999

Sing Buri (2 MP)
Chaiwut Thanakananusorn (Dem) 30,245
Payap Panket (TRT) 23,335

Suphan Buri (6 MPs)
Varawut Silpa-archa (CTP) 49,930
Kanchana Silpa-archa (CTP) 52,422
Natthawut Prasertsuwan (CTP) 49,575
Banharn Silpa-archa (CTP) 49,816
Prapat Pothasuthon (CTP) 52,545
Jongchai Thiengtham (CTP) 43,484

Trat (2 MP)
Boonsong Kaiket (Dem) 19,736
Thira Salakpet (Dem) 28,870

Uthai Thani (2 MPs)
Thiraphan Veerayutwattana (CTP) 33,358
Noppadol Polsen (CTP) 28,902

Northeast: 19 provinces, 138 seats

Amnat Charoen (2 MPs)
Thirachai Sirikhan (NAP) 27,545
Paisal Chanthawara (Dem) 26,162

Buri Ram (10 MPs)
Re-election
Karuna Chidchob (CTP) 33,813
Saksayam Chidchob (CTP) 31,508
Surasak Nakdee (TRT)24,965
Re-election
Sophon Saran (CTP) 23,027
Prakit Poladej (TRT) 35,407
& 9) Re-election
Songsak Thongsri(TRT) 37,944

Chaiyaphum (7 MPs)
Re-election
Chavalit Mahachan (TRT) 30,661
Kamsueng Prapakornkaewrat (TRT) 33,594
Wuthichai Sa-nguanwongchai (CPP) 38,557
Re-election
Charoen Chankomol (TRT) 40,052
Surawit Khonsomboon (Seritham) 30,776

Kalasin (6 MPs)
Sukhumpong Ngonkham (TRT) 25,432
Orradi Suthasri (CTP) 33,590
Vidthaya Phumlaochaeng (TRT) 37,378
Pirapet Sirikul (NAP) 19,702
Boonruen Sritharet (TRT) 27,852
Prasert Boonrueng (NAP) 33,260

Khon Kaen (11 MPs)
Charkrin Patdamrongkij (TRT) 30,742
Prachak Kaewklaharn (TRT) 29,721
Natronglert Surapol (SAP) 19,966
Re-election
Phum Sarapol (TRT) 29,721
Re-election
Suchai Srisurapol (TRT) 11,799
Somsak Khun-ngern (Seritham) 26,334
Re-election
Re-election
Premsak Piayura (NAP)31,751

Loei (4 MPs)
Tossaphon Sangkasub (TRT) 43,180
Thanapol Timsuwan (TRT) 37,802
Re-election
Suvit Yothongyos (Seritham) 16,100

Maha Sarakham (6 MPs)
Thonglor Polkote (TRT) 51,597
Chaiwat Tinrat (TRT) 31,593
Yuthapong Charassathien (Dem) 32,255
Charnchai Chairungrueng (TRT) 31,156
Kusumawadee Sirikomut (TRT) 29,864
Re-election

Mukdahan (2 MPs)
Pramualsin Pokesawat (Seritham) 21,812
Lawan Tantikulpong (TRT) 26,919

Nakhon Phanom (5 MPs)
Re-election
Re-election
Mongkol Buppasiri (NAP) 22,238
Re-election
Suphachai Phosu (NAP) 38,939

Nakhon Ratchasima (17 MPs)
Tewan Liptapanlop (CPP)
Wannarat Charnnukul (CPP) 47,211
Pravit Rattanapien (CPP) 46,320
Prateep Kreethavej (CPP) 35,099
Pitsinee Mungfakklang (TRT) 23,940
& 7) Re-election
Pairoj Suwanchawee (TRT) 37,841
& 10) Re-election
Somsak Phankasem (CPP) 53,142
Somchai Pretprasert (TRT) 34,480
Prasert Chanruangthong (TRT) 33,647
& 15) Re-election
16) Somsak Somklang (CPP) 25,985
17) Re-election

Nong Bua Lam Phu (3 MPs)
Kittisak Hatthasongkroh (TRT) 19,570
Re-election
Vichai Samit (TRT) 36,189

Nong Khai (6 MPs)
Pongpan Sunthornchai (TRT) 29,525
Prasit Chanthathong (TRT) 33,276
Ekthanut Inrod (TRT) 20,570
Tewarit Nikornthep (TRT) 22,312
Re-election
Niphon Konekayan (TRT) 21,929

Roi-et (9 MPs)
Sanit Wongsaktanapong (Seritham) 34,514
& 3) Re-election
Ekaparp Polsue (Seritham) 29,821
Nirand Namuangrak (TRT) 27,035
Nisit Sinthupai (NAP) 23,847
Kitti Somsap (TRT) 34,007
Sakda Kongpet (TRT) 46,332
Re-election

Sakon Nakhon (7 MPs)
Re-election
Chalermchai Urankul (NAP) 28,851
Narisorn Thongtiras (CTP) 19,494
Sakhon Prompakdi (Seritham) 24,189
Pongsak Boonsol (TRT) 25,917
Seri Saranant (TRT) 30,376
Kasem Utara (NAP) 21,566

Si Sa Ket (9 MPs)
Boonchong Veesommai (NAP) 22,701
Pitthaya Boonchaleo (NAP) 21,148
Wiwatchai Hotarawaisaya (CTP) 24,608
Chaturong Pengnoraphat (TRT) 39,347
Danairit Watcharaporn (TRT) 24,820
Tin Wongplang (CTP) 23,437
Re-election
Manop Charasdamrongnit (TRT) 37,354
Re-election

Surin (9 MPs)
Chuchai Mungcharoenporn (TRT) 30,502
Thirachote Kongthong (CTP) 23,847
Farida Sulaiman (TRT) 23,217
Re-election
Pradut Manmai (TRT) 16,484
Supalak Kuanha (TRT) 36,593
Re-election
Seksan Saenphum (TRT) 25,985
Teeyai Phoonsritanakul (TRT) 28,638

Udon Thani (10 MPs)
Sarawut Petpanomporn (CPP) 18,648
Atthapol Sanitwongchai (TRT) 23,518
Wichai Chaijitwanitkul (CPP) 24,724
Thirayuth Wanitchang (TRT) 22,777
Chaiyos Jiramethakorn (Dem) 26,597
Thongdee Manitsarn (TRT) 22,507
Thirachai Saenkaew (TRT) 22,278
Torpong Chaiyasan (Seritham) 23,054
Tharapong Leelawong (Seritham) 24,469
Surachart Chamnansin (Seritham) 29,562

Ubon Ratchathani (11 MPs)
Re-election
Re-election
Witoon Nambutr (TRT) 36,634
Re-election
Chuvit Pitakpornpallop (TRT) 35,773
Re-election
Adisak Pokkulkanond (TRT) 19,727
Poonsawat Hotrawaisaya (TRT) 31,004
Suchart Tantivanichanont (TRT) 41,358
Re-election
Chatri Piriyakitpaibul (TRT) 30,733

Yasothon (4 MPs)
Re-election
Re-election
Re-election
Visant Dejsen (NAP) 29,721

South: 14 provinces, 54 seats

Krabi (2 MPs)
Arkom Engchuan (Dem) 53,059
Pichet Phanvichartkul (Dem) 48,639

Chumphon (3 MPs)
Sirisak Onlamai (Dem) 49,635
Suchart Kaewnapo (Dem) 46,367
Suwaroj Palang (Dem) 50,578

Nakhon Si Thammarat (10 MPs)
Huwadiya Pitsuwan (Dem) 39,476
Surachet Masadit (Dem) 35,291
Narissa Adithepvoraphan (Dem) 46,045
Manoj Vichaikul (Dem) 39,517
Chinaworn Boonyakiat (Dem) 56,042
Tripol Jorjit (Dem) 46,699
Prakob Rattanaphan (Dem) 41,032
Chamni Sakdiset (Dem) 44,912
Apichart Karikan (Dem) 37,989
Vitthaya Kaewparadai (Dem) 39,988

Narathiwat (4 MPs)
Pornpit Pattanakullert (Dem) 34,135
Re-election
Najjamudin Uma (NAP) 23,454
Re-election

Pattani (4 MPs)
Weiroj Pipitpakdi (Dem) 24,553
Jeh Isamaair Jehmong (Dem) 26,041
Sommart Jehna (Dem) 24,902
Muk Sulaiman (NAP) 29,317

Phang-Nga (2 MP)
Kantawan Kuljanyavivat (Dem) 41,570
Julit Laksanavisit (Dem) 36,674

Phatthalung (3 MPs)
Suphat Thammapet (Dem) 45,887
Nipit Intharasombat (Dem) 43,245
Naris Kamnurak (Dem) 52,853

Phuket (2 MP)
Suwit Sa-ngiamkul (Dem) 44,198
Chalermlak Kebsub (Dem) 36,398

Ranong (1 MP)
Wirat Romyen (Dem) 36,059

Songkhla (8 MPs)
Jua Rachasi (Dem) 47,157
Lapsak Laparojkit (Dem) 45,253
Prai Pattano (Dem) 54,682
Vinai Senniem (Dem) 39,013
Nibhon Bunyamanee (Dem) 43,822
Tavorn Senniem (Dem) 50,638
Sirichoke Sopa (Dem) 39,097
Vichit Suwit (Dem) 34,503

Satun (2 MPs)
Thanin Jaisamut (Dem) 20,492
Sanan Suthakul (Dem) 21,450

Surat Thani (6 MPs)
Komet Kwanmuang (Dem) 43,751
Pravit Nilwatcharamanee (Dem) 44,976
Chumpol Kanchana (Dem) 36,751
Shane Thaughsuban (Dem) 42,680
Sinit Lertkrai (Dem) 55,609
Nipa Pringsulaka (Dem) 52,021

Trang (4 MPs)
Suwan Kusujarit (Dem) 57,208
Tawee Suraban (Dem) 65,458
Somchai Losathapornpipit (Dem) 50,503
Somboon Uthaiwiankul (Dem) 49,672

Yala (3 MPs)
Prasert Pongsuwansiri (Dem) 32,995
Paisal Yingsaman (NAP) 33,943
Burahanudin Useng (NAP) 25,386

References

Thailand
General
Elections in Thailand
General